Georgios Grivas (6 June 1897 – 27 January 1974), also known by his nickname Digenis, was a Cypriot general in the Hellenic Army and the leader of the Organization X (1942-1949), EOKA (1955-1959) and EOKA B (1971-1974) organisations.

A specialist of guerilla and asymmetric warfare, he was one of the main actors in the Cypriot War of Independence, securing the independence of Cyprus against the British Empire. He died months prior to the 1974 Cypriot coup d'état by the EOKA-B, and it's still unknown if he was aware of it.

Early life
Grivas was born in the Chrysaliniotissa area of Nicosia on 6 June 1897, the fourth child of Kalomira Hatzimichael and Theodoros Grivas. He grew up in Trikomo. After attending his village school, he studied at the Pancyprian Gymnasium in Nicosia from 1909 to 1915, living with his grandmother during this time.

Early military career
In 1916, Grivas moved to Greece; according to his obituary in The Times of London, he had left the family home after learning that his father intended him to become a physician. He took Greek citizenship and enrolled at the Hellenic Military Academy. He completed his military studies at the École Militaire in Paris. He graduated in 1919, and joined the Hellenic Army with the rank of Sub-Lieutenant and was immediately posted on the Asia Minor front of the Greco-Turkish War. He served in the Hellenic Army's 10th Division and participated in its advance from Smyrna to Panormos (today Bandirma) and Eskişehir, past Bursa and the Battle of Sakarya. With the subsequent retreat of the Hellenic Army from Asia Minor in 1922 (because of the Treaty of Lausanne), he was placed at Redestos in Thrace. He was decorated for his bravery and promoted to Lieutenant. He was later selected to study at the French Military Academy and upon his return to Greece he served in a number of posts, including that of a lecturer at the Hellenic Military Academy. He was promoted to captain in 1925 and to Major in 1935. Two years later he married Vasiliki Deka, the daughter of an Athenian pharmacist.

World War II and German occupation
With the beginning of World War II, Grivas was transferred to the operations department of the central headquarters of the Hellenic Army, working on the northern Greece's strategic defensive plans. When the Greco-Italian War broke out, Grivas was deployed to the Albanian front in December 1940, and served as Chief of Staff of the 2nd Division.

Following the German-Italian-Bulgarian occupation of Greece during World War II, Grivas founded and led the Organisation X, a minor far-right guerrilla organisation made up of officers of the Greek Army whose influence was limited to certain neighbourhoods of Athens. It played a minor role in the Greek Resistance to the Axis occupation of Greece. Its activities included spying for the Allied powers and launching minor attacks and sabotage operations against the occupiers. During the events of December 1944, members of Organisation X, using weapons recovered from the retreating Germans, fought at the Theseon alongside British and Greek monarchist forces to prevent EAM/ELAS fighters to take control of Athens.

In 1946, he retired from the Hellenic Army on his own request. His subsequent attempts to enter politics were unsuccessful.

The EOKA guerrilla campaign

Following his retirement, Grivas focused on the idea of ridding Cyprus of British colonial rule and uniting it with Greece (Enosis). As a member of the secret Committee for the Cyprus Struggle he took the oath of Enosis together with the newly elected Archbishop Makarios III, with whom he collaborated for preparing the armed struggle. He arrived secretly in Cyprus in November 1954 and began immediately the formation of his guerrilla organisation EOKA. On 1 April 1955 with a declaration that he signed as DIGENIS and a number of bombings against various targets in the four major cities and military installations, he announced the beginning of his campaign for Self Determination – Union with Greece.

He directed the first EOKA operations from his hideout in Nicosia but soon after he moved to the Troodos mountains to lead his guerrilla teams. At the time he wanted only British soldiers and their Greek collaborators to be targeted and prohibited attacks on the Turkish Cypriots. He recruited Grigoris Afxentiou as one of the team leaders, initially of the Famagusta district. Grivas escaped capture twice after he was surrounded by British forces at Spilia in December 1955, leading to the Battle of Spilia, and at Kykkos in May 1956. A month later, chased by the British forces, he was secretly transferred from the mountains by the car of a passionate EOKA fighter, Kostis Efstathiou, also known as "Pachykostis", and found refuge in a hideout at Limassol from where he directed not only the military activities but also the political campaign, since Archbishop Makarios in March 1956 was exiled by the authorities.

During the struggle, the British colonial administration had offered a reward of 10,000 British pounds plus passage to anywhere in the world for information leading to the arrest of Colonel Grivas.

Return to Greece
With the signing of the Zurich-London agreements in early 1959 and the declaration of Cyprus as an independent state Grivas reluctantly ordered cease-fire, since the struggle's main objective of Enosis was not achieved. His views were at odds with those of Makarios who had accepted the above agreements on behalf of the Greek Cypriot population. In March 1959, Grivas came out of his hideout and departed (in exile, requested by the UK as part of the cease fire agreement) for Athens where he received a hero's welcome as the liberator of the Greek Cypriots and was subsequently decorated with the highest honours by the Greek Parliament and the Athens Academy and promoted to the rank of General. Not long after his return, Grivas was persuaded to enter politics as head of a coalition party but soon abandoned this route after the disappointing percentage his party obtained in the general election of 1963.

Grivas returned to Cyprus in 1964 after the outbreak of intercommunal violence between Turkish Cypriots and Greek Cypriots to take over the Supreme Command of the Greek Cypriot forces organised under Makarios's National Guard as well as the Greek military division sent to Cyprus by the government of George Papandreou to assist in the island's defence against a possible Turkish attack. He directed the construction of defence forts and complexes aiming at withstanding a Turkish invasion. On 15 November 1967, Greek Cypriot National Guard under his direct command overran two small villages on the critical Larnaca, Limassol, Nicosia intersection, resulting in the deaths of 27 people, mostly armed Turkish Cypriot civilians as well as Turkish Cypriot paramilitaries at Kofinou and Agios Theodoros. The immediate result of this event was Turkey's ultimatum, which prompted the Greek military government to recall both the Greek Division and General Grivas to Athens.

From 1968 to 1969, under strict surveillance, Grivas participated in a resistance movement aiming at deposing the ruling military junta and restoring democracy in Greece, along with a number of Greek Army officers including Colonel Dimitrios Opropoulos and Majors Spyros Moustaklis, Nikolaos Lytras and George Karousos as well as Greek Cypriot students and professionals many of them former EOKA fighters. Grivas began the formation of armed resistance cells in a number of neighbourhoods in Athens which were armed with guns and explosives that were brought in secretly from Cyprus. The organisation, however, was discovered by the authorities and many of its members were arrested.

Later life and death
After the discovery of Grivas' plans by the authorities, he secretly returned to Cyprus on 31 August 1971, where he formed the armed organisation EOKA B, which he used as leverage in his attempts to persuade or force Makarios to change his policy and adopt the line of "Self Determination – Union" with Greece. EOKA B failed to overthrow Makarios but the armed struggle led to a vicious circle of violence and anti-violence that amounted to civil war among the Greek-Cypriot Community from 1971 to 1974.

While hiding at a house in Limassol on 27 January 1974, Grivas died of heart failure at the age of 76. The post-Grivas EOKA B then signed a secret agreement with Brigadier Dimitrios Ioannidis, the "invisible dictator" of Greece, and was controlled directly from Athens. Grivas' funeral and burial was held on 29 January 1974, in the garden of the house that had been Grivas' last hideout during the EOKA struggle (1955–1959) and was attended by tens of thousands of Greek Cypriots. Upon his death, the Cypriot Government declared a three-day official mourning and three days later, the Parliament of Cyprus declared General Grivas "A worthy son of the motherland". The government of Makarios, the target of Grivas' campaign for enosis, formally boycotted the event.

Aftermath
The Second Junta of Greece, under Ioannidis, overthrew Makarios just six months after Grivas' death. Ioannidis had been planning to overthrow Makarios in spring 1974, but the final decision to act was made on 2 July 1974 after Makarios decided to directly oppose the Ioannidis regime by expelling from the Cypriot National Guard 550 Greek officers. That meant the loss of military control of Cyprus for Greece as well as the humiliation of Ioannidis. The coup d'état of 15 July 1974 that overthrew Makarios was executed by forces of the Cypriot National Guard under direct instructions from Greece. The National Guard was led by Greek officers and consisted of Greek-Cypriot conscripts. The EOKA B members and other pro-enosis forces joined the National Guard in the afternoon of Monday 15 July 1974 in the fight against Makarios' forces. The coup was swiftly followed by the Turkish invasion of Cyprus on 20 July. This invasion took Ioannides by surprise, who failed to prepare Cyprus for a Turkish invasion and failed to coerce the Greek generals whom he had appointed to apply "Plan K" and provide military assistance to Cyprus. That marked the downfall of Ioannidis.

References

Sources

 Grivas-Digenis Georgios, Apomnimoneumata Agonos E.O.K.A. 1955–59, Athina 1961. third publishing, Athina 2013.
 Grivas-Digenis Georgios, Chronikon Agonos E.O.K.A. 1955-1959, Lefkosia 1971. second publishing, Lefkosia 1997
 Grivas George, General Grivas on Guerrilla Warfare. Translated by A. A. Palis, New York, N.Y., USA, Praeger, 1965
 Grivas George, Guerrilla warfare and EOKA's struggle: a politico-military study. (Translated by A. A. Pallis). London, G.B.: Longmans, Green, 1964
 Grivas George, The Memoirs of General Grivas. Edited by Charles Foley, New York, Frederick A. Praeger, 1965
 Papageorgiou Spyros, O Grivas kai i "X", To Chameno Archeio, Athens 2004
 Woodhouse, Christopher Montague (1948). Apple of Discord: A Survey of Recent Greek Politics in their International Setting. London
 H Tragiki Anametrisi kai i Prodosia tis Kyprou-Marios Adamides-Nicosia-2011-E-Book.

1897 births
1974 deaths
Cypriot biographers
Cypriot military personnel
Cypriot political writers
Hellenic Army lieutenant generals
Greek nationalists
Greek anti-communists
Greek Resistance members
Greek monarchists
Greek memoirists
Cypriot people of the EOKA
Guerrilla warfare theorists
EOKA B
People educated at Pancyprian Gymnasium
20th-century Cypriot writers
20th-century memoirists
People from Nicosia
People from Famagusta District